Maria Luisa Catricalà (Vibo Valentia, 1946) best known by the stage name Louiselle is an Italian singer of the 1960s and '70s. She achieved as success with "Ascoltami" in 1965, written with lyrics by Carlo Rossi and music by Vittorio Bezzi; the song was also covered by Dalida.

References

1946 births
Living people
20th-century Italian women singers